Veterans Memorial Stadium is a 9,000 seat stadium in Lawrence, Massachusetts.  The stadium is located adjacent to the Lawrence High School. The venue opened in 1927 and was renovated in 2006. It currently serves as the home field for the Lawrence High School Lancers and the Central Catholic High School Raiders sports teams including football, soccer, lacrosse, and outdoor track and field.

The stadium is also home to the semi-pro football team Merrimack Valley Maulers of the New England Football League.

The Stadium has hosted national drum corps competition every summer since its renovation. It also hosts the Massachusetts Instrumental and Choral Conductors Association State Finals and the New England Scholastic Band Association Finals for marching band every year. 

It was considered as a possible new location for the New Hampshire Phantoms minor league soccer club of the USL Second Division; The club eventually decided to stay in New Hampshire.

External links
Article on venues re-opening
Article on possible move of Phantoms

1927 establishments in Massachusetts
American football venues in Massachusetts
Athletics (track and field) venues in Massachusetts
Buildings and structures in Lawrence, Massachusetts
High school football venues in the United States
Lacrosse venues in Massachusetts
Monuments and memorials in Massachusetts
Soccer venues in Massachusetts
Sports in Lawrence, Massachusetts
Sports venues completed in 1927